Brendon is a village in Devon, England. It may also refer to:

People
 Brendon (singer), a former British pop/glam rock singer born Brendon Dunning
 Brendon Ayanbadejo, an American football linebacker
 Brendon Hartley, a New Zealand racecar driver
 Brendon McCullum, a New Zealand cricketer
 Brendon Šantalab, Australian footballer
 Brendon Small, an American stand-up comedian, actor, composer, and musician
 Brendon Urie, American musician known as the sole remaining member of Panic! at the Disco
 Brendon (footballer, born 1992), Brendon Eric de Souza Silva, Brazilian football midfielder
 Brendon (footballer, born 1995), Brendon Lucas da Silva Estevam, Brazilian football centre-back for Ho Chi Minh City
 Brendon (footballer, born 2002), Brendon Valença Sobral, Brazilian football midfielder for Resende

Places
 Brendon Hills, a range in Somerset, England

See also
Bendon (disambiguation)
Brandon (disambiguation)